The Women's 5,000 metres event at the 2003 Pan American Games took place on Wednesday August 6, 2003. For the third time in a row the title went to Mexico's Adriana Fernández. She set a new Pan Am record in the final, beating her own record (15:46.32) established in 1995 (Mar del Plata).

Medalists

Records

Results

See also
2003 World Championships in Athletics – Women's 5000 metres
Athletics at the 2004 Summer Olympics – Women's 5000 metres

Notes

References
Results

5,000 metres, Women's
2003
2003 in women's athletics